James Joseph Condon (15 September 1895 – 19 December 1955) was an Australian rules footballer who played with Essendon in the Victorian Football League (VFL).

Notes

External links 

1895 births
1955 deaths
Australian rules footballers from Victoria (Australia)
Essendon Football Club players